The Roman bridge of Ávila (in Spanish: Puente Romano de Ávila) is a bridge at Ávila, in Castile and León, Spain. Portions of the bridge are Roman, and it is preserved as a historic monument (Bien de Interés Cultural).

Spanning the Adaja River, the bridge was on a route leading to the Decumanus Maximus within the walls of Ávila.
Of the original structure built in the early-1st century A.D., the piers with their starlings survive; the rest of the bridge is Romanesque (11th and 13th centuries).

Description
It consists of five arches and four piers with starling, bow of boat shaped projection against the rising of the stream, Roman style, projecting spurs in the piers to contrary side to the sterling, preserving the west side abutment. The top of the bridge (road) is horizontal in the eastern half presenting the other half falling to west. The arches start from different height reaching its top at the same elevation, except the more amplitude, entirely remade, it appears lower.

Apparently the bridge was disabled, on an unspecified date, totally destroying the biggest arch and cut the rest, tears still clearly visible today. In this sense the more possible was that the disablement of the bridge had taken place in the same period of the Arab invasion to 711, it is also possible that the semidestruction of the bridge would have happened at any time of the Reconquista when, coming the swollen river, any Arab or Christian army would have believed necessary to get rid of their pursuers or cut off their retreat.

At the time of the Ávila's repopulation (11th century), the bridge was rebuilt on its granite Roman pillars. This was done with sandstone from La Colilla, widely used in the Romanesque churches in Ávila, but with little resistance to wear. In the 13th century a new repair was made, whose remains are probably the granitic rocks of the upper topped with a rounded parapet in the style of the Santi Espiritu and Romanillos bridges on the Chico River.

References

Avila
Bridges completed in the 1st century
Buildings and structures in Ávila, Spain
Bien de Interés Cultural landmarks in the Province of Ávila
Stone bridges in Spain
Pedestrian bridges in Spain
Bridges in Castile and León